Fred Cordeiro is a Portuguese kickboxer.

Championships and accomplishments
Amateur
Portugal Kickboxing Federation
 2011 National Championship K-1 Junior (class C) -54kg Runner-up
 2012 National Championship Low Kick Junior (class C) -57kg Champion
 2012 National Cup Low Kick Junior (class C) -54kg Champion
 2013 National Championship Low Kick Junior (class C) -57kg Champion
 2012-2013 Athlete of the Year
 2014 National Championship Low Kick Senior (class B) -57kg Champion
 2013-2014 Athlete of the Year

World Association of Kickboxing Organizations
 2013 WAKO Low Kick Junior (class C) European Championship -57kg 
 2014 WAKO Low Kick Junior (class C) World Championship -57kg 

Professional
DUEL Fight Sports
 2015 DUEL Superfight Bantamweight Champion
 2015 DUEL Superfight Lightweight Champion

 World Kickboxing League
 2016 WKL European -61kg Champion 

World Kickboxing Association
 2018 WKA World -55kg Champion

International Professional Combat Council
 2019 IPCC Europe -60kg Champion

International Sport Kickboxing Association
 2021 ISKA Muay Thai Europe -55kg Champion

Kickboxing & Muay thai record

|-  style="background:#;"
| 2023-03-25|| || align="left" | Jordan Swinton || Combat Fight Series 12 || London, England || || ||
|-
! style=background:white colspan=9 |

|-  style="background:#fbb;"
| 2022-02-05|| Loss || align="left" | Silviu Vitez || HMF Custom Fighters || Madrid, Spain|| Decision|| 3|| 3:00

|-  style="background:#cfc;"
| 2021-12-01|| Win|| align="left" | Renaud Gurgui  || Diamond League || Lisbon, Portugal || KO (Left Hook)|| 2||

|-  style="background:#cfc;"
| 2021-04-24|| Win|| align="left" | Mikel Fernandez  || Mamba Fight Club Showdown 011 || Ponferrada, Spain || KO (Left Cross)|| 1||
|-
! style=background:white colspan=9 |
|-  style="background:#fbb;"
| 2020-01-11|| Loss||align=left| Zhao Chongyang || Wu Lin Feng 2020: WLF World Cup 2019-2020 Final  || Zhuhai, China ||Decision (Unanimous)|| 3 || 3:00
|-  style="background:#cfc;"
| 2019-12-07|| Win ||align=left| Massi Rahimi  || Pegasus Fight || Switzerland || Decision ||5 || 3:00
|-
! style=background:white colspan=9 |
|-  style="background:#cfc;"
| 2019-11-09|| Win ||align=left| Joao Goncalves  || Strikers League|| Carcavelos, Portugal || KO (Right Hook) ||1 || 1:30
|-  style="background:#fbb;"
| 2019-10-05|| Loss ||align=left| Akram Hamidi || Kings Of Muay Thai || Luxembourg, Luxembourg || Decision (Unanimous) || 5 || 3:00
|-
! style=background:white colspan=9 |
|-  style="background:#cfc;"
| 2019-05-04|| Win ||align=left| Xavi Vizcaino || Heroes Night 10 || Spain || KO || 1 ||
|-  style="background:#fbb;"
| 2019-03-10 || Loss ||align=left| Rungkit Wor.Sanprapai || Rise World Series 2019 First Round || Tokyo, Japan || Decision (Unanimous) || 3 || 3:00
|-  style="background:#cfc;"
| 2018-11-25 || Win ||align=left|  Davicillo Lahm || Invencibles VIII|| Getafe, Spain || KO (Left Hook) || 1 || 
|-
! style=background:white colspan=9 |
|-  style="background:#cfc;"
| 2018-10-13|| Win ||align=left| Sofiane Meddar  || Nuit de l'Uppercut 3 || France || Decision (Unanimous) || 3 || 3:00
|-  style="background:#cfc;"
| 2018-05-05|| Win ||align=left| Darren Rolland || Phenix Boxing Only - Edition 6 || Saint-Julien-en-Genevois, France || Decision (Unanimous) || 3 || 3:00
|-  style="background:#cfc;"
| 2018-01-27 || Win ||align=left| Alejandro Rivas  || Brothers League VII || Portugal || Decision||3 || 3:00
|-  style="background:#cfc;"
| 2016-04-09|| Win ||align=left| Gary Laws  || DUEL 6 || Newcastle, England || KO (Spinning back kick) || 3 || 
|-
! style=background:white colspan=9 |
|-  style="background:#fbb;"
| 2016-03-26|| Loss ||align=left| Tenshin Nasukawa || RISE 110 || Tokyo, Japan || Decision (unanimous) || 5 || 3:00
|-
! style=background:white colspan=9 |
|-  style="background:#cfc;"
| 2015-12-12|| Win ||align=left| Roman Skulskyi || Diamond League|| Lisbon, Portugal || KO  || 2 ||
|-  style="background:#cfc;"
| 2015-11-28|| Win ||align=left| Ross Cochrane || Headhunters || Grangemouth, Scotland || KO (Right Hook) || 1 ||
|-  style="background:#cfc;"
| 2015-09-27|| Win ||align=left| John Spencer  || DUEL 5 || Newcastle, England || KO (Low Kick) || 1 || 
|-
! style=background:white colspan=9 |
|-  style="background:#cfc;"
| 2015-03-21|| Win ||align=left| Connor Long || DUEL 4 || Newcastle, England || KO (Right Cross) || 2 || 
|-
! style=background:white colspan=9 |
|-  style="background:#cfc;"
| 2014-11-08|| Win ||align=left| Andy Hughes || DUEL 3 || Newcastle, England || KO (Knee to the Head) || 1 || 
|-
! style=background:white colspan=9 |
|-
| colspan=9 | Legend:    

|-  style="background:#fbb;"
| 2016-09-24|| Loss||align=left| Lawrence Korede || WAKO K-1 European Cup, -60kg Tournament 1/8 Final  || Prague, Czech Republic ||Decision (Split)||  ||
|-  style="background:#fbb;"
| 2016-03-05|| Loss ||align=left| Daniele Panetta|| WAKO Irish open, Full Contact -57kg Semi Final  || Dublin, Ireland ||Decision (Majority) ||  ||
|-  style="background:#cfc;"
| 2016-03-04|| Win ||align=left| Firouzadeh Said Shahwali|| WAKO Irish open, Full Contact -57kg Quarter Final  || Dublin, Ireland ||Decision (Unanimous) ||  ||
|-  style="background:#cfc;"
| 2014-10-18|| Win ||align=left| Jaba Memishishi|| WAKO European Championship, Low Kick -57kg Tournament Quarter Final  || Bilbao, Spain ||Decision (Split) ||  ||
|-  style="background:#fbb;"
| 2014-09-|| Loss ||align=left| Aleksandr Borisov || WAKO Junior World Championship 2014, Low Kick -57kg Tournament Final  || Rimini, Italy || Decision ||  ||   
|-
! style=background:white colspan=9 |
|-  style="background:#cfc;"
| 2014-09-|| Win ||align=left| Muhamet Deskaj || WAKO Junior World Championship 2014, Low Kick -57kg Tournament Semi Final  || Rimini, Italy || Decision ||  ||
|-  style="background:#cfc;"
| 2014-09-|| Win ||align=left| Filip Halaj || WAKO Junior World Championship 2014, Low Kick -57kg Tournament Quarter Final  || Rimini, Italy || Decision ||  ||
|-  style="background:#cfc;"
| 2014-09-|| Win ||align=left| Jon Sarasketa || WAKO Junior World Championship 2014, Low Kick -57kg Tournament 1/8 Final  || Rimini, Italy || Decision ||  ||
|-  style="background:#cfc;"
| 2013-09-|| Win ||align=left| Zhorab Azimov|| WAKO European Championship Junior, Low Kick -57kg Tournament Final  || Poland ||Decision ||  ||   
|-
! style=background:white colspan=9 |
|-  style="background:#cfc;"
| 2013-09-|| Win ||align=left| Timur Musaev|| WAKO European Championship Junior, Low Kick -57kg Tournament Semi Final  || Poland ||Decision ||  ||
|-  style="background:#cfc;"
| 2013-09-14|| Win ||align=left| Ivanou Uladzislau|| WAKO European Championship Junior, Low Kick -57kg Tournament Quarter Final  || Poland ||Decision ||  ||   
|-
| colspan=9 | Legend:

Professional boxing record

See also
 List of male kickboxers

References 

Portuguese male kickboxers

1995 births
Living people